R103 road may refer to:
 R103 road (Ireland)
 R103 road (South Africa)